Giacomo Pylarini or Jacobus Pylarinus (Greek: Ιάκωβος Πυλαρινός; 1659–1718) was a Greek physician and consul for the republic of Venice in Smyrna. In 1716 he became the first person to have an account of the practice of inoculation published by the Royal Society.

He studied law and then medicine at the University of Padua before qualifying as a physician. He travelled to different parts of Asia and Africa and practised both at Smyrna and Constantinople. In Moscow he was appointed physician to the Russian Tsar Peter the Great.

He returned to Smyrna for the second time and resided there as the Venetian Consul as well as practising physician.

References

17th-century Italian physicians
18th-century Italian physicians
1659 births
1718 deaths
Smallpox
People from Paliki
Republic of Venice diplomats